Down on the Street is the fifth studio album by the London jazz-funk band Shakatak, released in 1984. The album peaked at no. 17 on the UK Albums Chart, and produced the band's second top-ten UK single "Down on the Street", which peaked at no. 9 on the UK Singles Chart. The album produced two other singles: "Watching You" and "Don't Blame It on Love".

Track listing
All tracks written by Bill Sharpe & Roger Odell except where noted.

Side A
"Down on the Street" – 3:22
"Holding On" (George Anderson/Jill Saward) – 4:34
"Summer Sky"  – 4:22
"Hypnotised" (Sharpe) – 4:28

Side B
"Don't Blame It on Love"  – 3:25
"Photograph" – 4:25
"Watching You" – 5:22
"Fire Dance" – 5:00
"Lady (To Billie Holiday)" – 3:11

Charts

Album charts

Singles charts

Personnel
 Jill Saward – vocals
 Bill Sharpe – keyboards
 George Anderson – bass guitar
 Keith Winter – guitars
 Roger Odell – drums

References

1984 albums
Albums produced by Nigel Wright
Polydor Records albums
Shakatak albums